

List of rulers of the Ewe state of Peki (Krepi)

See also
Ewe people
Ghana
Gold Coast
Lists of incumbents

Rulers
Politics of Ghana
Lists of African rulers